The 1990 Detroit Lions season was the 61st season in franchise history and their 57th in Detroit. Despite a stellar season from Barry Sanders who scored 16 touchdowns and led the league in rushing, the Lions took a step backward and finished in third place with a disappointing, seventh-consecutive losing record of 6–10, as they struggled to find a consistent quarterback. The conclusion of this season meant that up to this point, the Lions had only made three playoff appearances, won only one division title and not won a single playoff game since their last NFL Championship in 1957.

Offseason

NFL Draft

Personnel

Staff

Roster

Regular season

Schedule

Season summary

Week 12 vs Broncos

Standings

Player stats

Rushing

Receiving

Awards and records 
 Jerry Ball, Second-Team All-Pro selection
 Jerry Ball, Pro Bowl Reserve Selection
 Lomas Brown, Second-Team All-Pro selection
 Mike Cofer, Second-Team All-Pro selection
 Mel Gray, First-Team All-Pro selection
 Eddie Murray, Pro Bowl Selection
 Barry Sanders, First-Team All-Pro selection
 Barry Sanders, Pro Bowl Selection
 Chris Spielman, Pro Bowl Reserve Selection

References

External links 
 1990 Detroit Lions at Pro-Football-Reference.com

Detroit Lions
Detroit Lions seasons
Detroit Lions